The 1923 Chatham Cup was the first annual nationwide football competition in New Zealand.

The competition was run on a regional basis, with separate northern and southern tournaments, with the winners of the two meeting in the final. Very few teams entered the competition, including only two from the southern South Island; Seacliff easily won the only match played there, thumping Oamaru 7-0, and repeated this in the final, accounting for Wellington's YMCA 4-0.

Of the teams taking part, it is known that four were from Wellington; contemporary reports indicate that Diamonds, Y.M.C.A. (Wellington), Hospital and Waterside took part. The Wellington FA scheduled their first Chatham Cup fixture for 11 August, between the Y.M.C.A. (Wellington) and Waterside at the Basin Reserve. Admission to the match cost one shilling.

The management committee of the Auckland Football Association (A.F.A.) announced at its meeting on 5 June that Chatham Cup entries had closed with the North Shore, Philomel, Harbour Board, Brotherhood, Auckland Thistle, Northcote and Ponsonby clubs entering. Meeting again on 12 June, the A.F.A. decided the second round of fixtures for the Auckland League Championship would count toward Chatham Cup qualification, with League Championship second round commencing on 16 June. Y.M.C.A. (Auckland) was admitted to compete for the Chatham Cup by the A.F.A. at its management committee meeting on 19 June.

There is some suggestion that the Auckland regional winners, Northcote required a play-off against North Shore United to progress.

The Wairarapa Football Association clubs, Waingawa, Post and Telegraph, Masterton and Y.M.C.A. (Masterton) sent entrance fees to join the 1923 Chatham Cup, which were received by the N.Z.F.A. in early June. The first two Chatham Cup fixtures held by the Wairarapa FA took place on June 30, with Post and Telegraph (P & T) versus the Masterton Y.M.C.A. at Masterton's Park Oval, and Waingawa playing Masterton at the Cole Street Ground.

The Dawber's Motor Depot. side changed its name to Athletic (Palmerston North) in 1925.

There is some confusion about the earlier rounds of the competition, with various Charity Cups being held to decide entrants to the Chatham Cup, and with regional qualification finals, island finals, and the national final all simply being referred to in contemporary reports as "finals". Compounding this, different regional football associations were allowed to choose their champion team by whatever method they liked, meaning that some regions (such as Auckland) used league position to determine their entrant for the inter-regional matches, rather than a knockout competition. Compounding matters further are the incomplete records held by the NZFA, which omit several matches (including the semi-final between Seacliff and Oamaru Rangers).

The 1923 final

Played at Athletic Park, Wellington on 1 October 1923, Seacliff met YMCA Wellington in the first Chatham Cup final.
In the final, YMCA had the better of early possession, but Seacliff gained the upper hand as the match progressed. Centre-forward Bill Hooper scored the first goal just before the half-time interval. Shortly after the break Reg Baxter doubled the lead. Late on right wing Malcolm McDougall scored again, followed only a minute later by a second from Hooper. The line-up of the first Chatham Cup winning side was as follows: Charlie Rivers, Jock Anderson, George Anderson, Bill Rogers, Hugh McKechnie, Bill Murray, Malcolm McDougall, Reg Baxter, Bill Hooper, R. "Tommy" Burns, Wattie Hanlin.

The Mayor of Wellington, Robert Wright presented the cup to Seacliff on the ground after the match.

Results
Auckland Football Association - Qualifying league results (2nd round of Auckland Championship League)

Rest of New Zealand - knock-out qualifiers

Semi-final

Final
Teams

Seacliff: Charlie Rivers, George Anderson, Jock Anderson, Bill Rogers, Hugh McKechnie, Bill Murray, Malcolm Macdougall, Reg Baxter, Bill Hooper, Tommy Burns, Wattie Hanlin 

Wellington Y.M.C.A: Arthur Tarrant, W. Pearson, Les McGirr, George Wotherspoon, Bill Rarity, Charlie Trott, Les Smith, Edgar Phillips, George Campbell, Harry Hindmarsh, Charles Ballard

References

Rec.Sport.Soccer Statistics Foundation New Zealand 1923 page

Chatham Cup
Chatham Cup
Chatham Cup